Allium crispum is a species of wild onion known by the common name crinkled onion. It is endemic to California, where it grows along the Central Coast in the Coast Ranges and in the Santa Monica Mountains, often in clays and serpentine soils. It is a perennial herb that is typically found in the foothill woodlands and valley grasslands of California.

Description
Allium crispum grows from a bulb one to one and a half centimeters wide and sends up naked green stems topped with inflorescences of many flowers, each on a short pedicel. The flowers are magenta in color and have six triangular tepals. The inner three tepals are smaller and crinkled like cloth and may curl under. Anthers and pollen are yellow. The leaves are narrow and linear, typically slightly shorter than the stems and about 1.5 millimeters wide.

A. crispum reaches 10-20 centimeters tall. Flowers typically appear between March and June in the US. The plant prefers part shade.

Gallery

See also
California montane chaparral and woodlands

References

External links

Jepson Manual Treatment — Allium crispum
USDA Plants Profile: Allium crispum
Allium crispum - U.C. Photo gallery

crispum
Endemic flora of California
Natural history of the California Coast Ranges
Onions
Plants described in 1888
Taxa named by Edward Lee Greene